Penarth Dock railway station served the docks area of Penarth.

Description 

The Taff Vale Railway built its line to Penarth in 1865, later extending it to Lavernock, Sully and Cadoxton. Penarth Dock and Harbour station opened in 1878. The name was changed to Penarth Dock in 1928. The station was staffed and had two platforms with substantial buildings, linked by a footbridge. Despite this, it was very quiet during the day, and received almost all its revenue from morning and evening rush hour trains. It was closed on Sundays.

Closure 
The station closed in January 1962. Most of the buildings are still present, and have been used by a range of businesses, including a shooting range, a garden centre, a second-hand car lot and a marine chandlers. The line is still open as far as Penarth, though it has been single track since 1967.

See also 
 Penarth railway station

References

External links 
 

Dock railway station
Former Taff Vale Railway stations
Disused railway stations in the Vale of Glamorgan
Railway stations in Great Britain opened in 1878
Railway stations in Great Britain closed in 1962